The Bible contains many references to slavery, which was a common practice in antiquity. Biblical texts outline sources and the legal status of slaves, economic roles of slavery, types of slavery, and debt slavery, which thoroughly explain the institution of slavery in Israel in antiquity. The Bible stipulates the treatment of slaves, especially in the Old Testament. There are also references to slavery in the New Testament.

Many of the patriarchs portrayed in the Bible were from the upper echelons of society, owned slaves, enslaved those in debt to them, bought their fellow citizens' daughters as concubines, and consistently enslaved foreign men to work on their fields. Masters were men, and it is not evident that women were able to own slaves until the Elephantine papyri in the 400s BC. Other than these instances, it is unclear whether or not state-instituted slavery was an accepted practice.

It was necessary for those who owned slaves, especially in large numbers, to be wealthy because the masters had to pay taxes for Jewish and non-Jewish slaves because they were considered part of the family unit. Slaves were seen as an important part of the family's reputation, especially in Hellenistic and Roman times, and slave companions for a woman were seen as a manifestation and protection of a woman's honor. As time progressed, domestic slavery became more prominent, and domestic slaves, usually working as an assistant to the wife of the patriarch, allowed larger houses to run more smoothly and efficiently.

In the 19th century United States, abolitionists and defenders of slavery debated the Bible's message on the topic. Abolitionists used texts from both the Old and New Testaments to argue for the manumission of slaves, and against kidnapping or "stealing men" to own or sell them as slaves.

Slavery in antiquity

Slaves performed a variety of tasks. To determine what a slave's task was, many scholars look at repetitive descriptions which are contained in texts that were written around the same time and they also look at well-documented reports about other cultures which were written by authors who were raised in the Greco-Roman culture. One of the main functions of slaves was to serve as status symbols for the upper members of society, especially when it came to the acquisition of dowries for their daughters. These slaves could be sold or given away as needed, and they also showed that the family was capable of providing generous amounts of money to their daughters when they were married off. They also catered to the needs of the temple and they performed more domestic tasks such as keeping up the household, raising farm animals and growing small amounts of crops. Masters frequently took advantage of their slaves who were at their beck and call by requiring them to perform duties in public that the master had the ability to do himself. This showed a level of luxury which extended from the private sphere to the public sphere. In addition to showing luxury, the possession of slaves was necessary for a good family background, and many wealthy men viewed their colleagues who only possessed a few slaves as the type of individual who needed to be pitied.

Old Testament

War captives
The Israelites did not generally get involved in distant or large-scale wars, and apparently capture was not a significant source of slaves.

The taking of female captives is encouraged by Moses in Numbers 31. After being instructed by Yahweh to take vengeance upon the Midianites, Moses tells the Israelites to kill the male children and nonvirgin females but take the young virgins for themselves. Kent Brown at Whitworth University claims that since the army did not receive a direct instruction by Yahweh to take the virgin girls captive, this cannot be justified as the obeying of a divine order; rather the Israelites enslaved the virgin women of their own initiative.

In the Deuteronomic Code, enemy nations that surrendered to the Israelites were to serve as tributaries. However, if they decided to war against Israel, all the men were to be killed and all the women and children were to be considered spoils of war.

If the soldier desired to marry a captured foreigner he was to take her home to his house, shave her head, pare her nails, and discard her captive's garb. She would remain in his house a full month, mourning for her father and mother, after that he could go in to her and be her husband, and she be his wife. If he later wished to end the relationship, he could not sell her into slavery. 

Harold C. Washington of the Saint Paul School of Theology cites Deuteronomy 21:10-14 as an example of how the Bible condones sexual violence committed by Israelites; they were taking advantage of women who, as war captives, had no recourse or means of self defense.

M.I. Rey at the Graduate Institute of Religious Studies at Boston University argues that the passage is an endorsement of not only sexual slavery but genocidal rape, as the capture of these women is justified on the grounds of their not being Hebrew. Rey further argues that these women were not viewed as equals to Hebrew women, but rather as war trophies, and thus their captors had no qualms in engaging in sexual violence. However, the biblical command never specifies that the war in question is against non-Hebrews, but rather against generic "enemies", a term used in reference to Israelites as well as foreigners, and several wars between Israelite armies are recorded in the Bible.

According to many Jewish commentators, the laws of the captive woman are not intended to encourage capture and forced marriage of women, but rather view it as inevitable in wartime and seek to minimize its occurrence and brutality. By this view, the laws of Deuteronomy 21:12-13 (that the captive woman must shave her head, spend a month in mourning, etc. before marriage) are intended "to remove [the captor's] desire for her, so that he not take her as wife".A Jewish soldier should not take a captive non-jewish woman as a wife because the result of such a relationship is a son who will rebel against his father as happened to King David and Absalom.

Fugitive slaves
The Deuteronomic Code forbids the Israelites from handing over fugitive slaves to their masters or oppressing them, and instructs that these fugitives should be allowed to reside where they wish. Although a literal reading would indicate that this applies to slaves of all nationalities and locations, the Mishnah and many commentators consider the rule to have the much narrower application, to just those slaves who flee from outside Israelite territory into it.

Blood slavery
It was also possible to be born into slavery. If a male Israelite slave had been given a wife by his owner, then the wife and any children which had resulted from the union would remain the property of his owner, according to the Covenant Code. Although no nationality is specified, 18th-century theologians John Gill (1697–1771) and Adam Clarke suggested this referred only to Canaanite concubines.

Debt slavery
Like the rest of the Ancient Near East, the legal systems of the Israelites divided slaves into different categories: "In determining who should benefit from their intervention, the legal systems drew two important distinctions: between debt and chattel slaves, and between native and foreign slaves. The authorities intervened first and foremost to protect the former category of each--citizens who had fallen on hard times and had been forced into slavery by debt or famine."

Poverty, and more generally a lack of economic security, compelled some people to enter debt bondage. In the Ancient Near East, wives and (non-adult) children were dependents of the head of household and were sometimes sold into slavery by the husband or father for financial reasons. Evidence of this viewpoint is found in the Code of Hammurabi, which permits debtors to sell their wives and children into temporary slavery, lasting a maximum of three years. The book of Leviticus also exhibits this, allowing foreign residents to sell their own children and families to Israelites, although no limitation is placed on the duration of such slavery. Biblical authors repeatedly criticize debt slavery, which could be attributed to high taxation, monopoly of resources, high-interest loans, and collapse of higher kinship groups.

Debt slaves were one of the two categories of slaves in ancient Jewish society. As the name implies, these individuals sold themselves into slavery in order to pay off debts they may have accrued. These individuals were not permanently in this situation and were usually released after six to seven years. Chattel slaves, on the other hand, were less common and were usually prisoners of war who retained no individual right of redemption. These chattel slaves engaged in full-time menial labor, often in a domestic capacity.

The earlier Covenant Code instructs that, if a thief is caught after sunrise and is unable to make restitution for the theft, then the thief should be enslaved.

Sexual and conjugal slavery

There were two words used for female slaves, which were amah (אָמָה) and shifhah (שִׁפְחָה). Based upon the uses in different texts, the words appear to have the same connotations and are used synonymously, namely that of being a sexual object, though the words themselves appear to be from different ethnic origins. Men assigned their female slaves the same level of dependence as they would a wife. Close levels of relationships could occur given the amount of dependence placed upon these women. These slaves had two specific roles: a sexual use and companionship. Their reproductive capacities were valued within their roles within the family. Marriage with these slaves was not unheard of or prohibited. In fact, it was a man's concubine that was seen as the "other" and shunned from the family structure. These female slaves were treated more like women than slaves which may have resulted, according to some scholars, due to their sexual role, which was particularly to "breed" more slaves.

Sexual slavery, or being sold to be a wife was common in the ancient world. Throughout the Old Testament, the taking of multiple wives is recorded many times. An Israelite father could sell his unmarried daughters into servitude, with the expectation or understanding that the master or his son could eventually marry her (as in Exodus 21:7-11.) It is understood by Jewish and Christian commentators that this referred to the sale of a daughter, who "is not arrived to the age of twelve years and a day, and this through poverty."

The code also instructs that the woman was to be allowed to be redeemed if the man broke his betrothal to her. If a female slave was betrothed to the master's son, then she had to be treated as a normal daughter. If he took another wife, then he was required to continue supplying the same amounts of food, clothing, and conjugal rights to her. The code states that failure to comply with these regulations would automatically grant free manumission to the enslaved woman, while all Israelite slaves were to be treated as hired servants.

The penalty if an Israelite engaged in sexual activity with an unredeemed female slave who was betrothed was that of scourging, with Jewish tradition seeing this as only referring to the slave, (versus , where both parties were stoned, being free persons), as well as the man confessing his guilt and the priest making atonement for his sin.

Permanent enslavement

As for Israelite slaves, the Covenant Code allows them to voluntarily renounce their seventh-year manumission and become permanent slaves (literally being slaves forever). The Law require that the slaves confirmed this desire "before God", a phrase which has been understood to mean at either a religious sanctuary, before judges, or in the presence of household gods. Having done this, slaves were then to have an awl driven through their ear into a doorpost by their master. This ritual was common throughout the Ancient Near East, being practiced by Mesopotamians, Lydians, and Arabs; in the Semitic world, the ear symbolised obedience (much as the heart symbolises emotion, in the modern western world), and a pierced earlobe signified servitude.

Slave trade
The Holiness code of Leviticus explicitly allows participation in the slave trade, with non-Israelite residents who had been sold into slavery being regarded as a type of property that could be inherited.

Working conditions
The Ten Commandments make clear that honouring the Shabbat was expected of slaves, not just their masters. The later book of Deuteronomy, having repeated the Shabbat requirement, also instructs that slaves should be allowed to celebrate the Sukkot festival.

Leviticus instructs that during the Sabbatical Year, slaves and their masters should eat food which the land yields, without being farmed. This commandment not to work the land is directed at the landowner and does not mention slaves, but other verses imply that no produce is sown by anyone in this year, and command that the land must "lie fallow". It is not mentioned whether slaves receive rest from non-agricultural work during this year.

Unlike the other books, Leviticus does not mention the freeing of Israelite slaves after six years, instead simply giving the vague instruction that Israelite slaves should not to be compelled to work with rigour; Maimonides argues that this was to be interpreted as forbidding open-ended work (such as keep doing that until I come back), and that disciplinary action was not to include instructing the slave to perform otherwise pointless work.

A special case is that of the debtor who sells himself as a slave to his creditor; Leviticus instructs that in this situation, the debtor must not be made to do the work of slaves, but must instead be treated the same as a hired servant. In Jewish tradition, this was taken to mean that the debtor should not be instructed to do humiliating work - which only slaves would do - and that the debtor should be asked to perform the craft(s) which they usually did before they had been enslaved, if it is realistic to do so.

Injury and compensation
The earlier Covenant Code provides a potentially more valuable and direct form of relief, namely a degree of protection for the slave's person (their body and its health) itself. This codification extends the basic lex talionis (....eye for an eye, tooth for a tooth...), to compel that when slaves are significantly injured by their masters, manumission is to be the compensation given; the canonical examples mentioned are the knocking out of an eye or a tooth. This resembles the earlier Code of Hammurabi, which instructs that when an injury is done to a social inferior, monetary compensation should be made, instead of carrying out the basic lex talionis; Josephus indicates that by his time it was acceptable for a fine to be paid to the slave, instead of manumitting them, if the slave agreed. Nachmanides argued that it was a biblically commanded duty to liberate a slave who had been harmed in this way.

The Hittite laws and the Code of Hammurabi both insist that if a slave is harmed by a third party, the third party must financially compensate the owner. In the Covenant Code, if an ox gores a slave, the ox owner must pay the servant's master a 30 shekel fine.

The murder of slaves by owners was prohibited in the Law covenant. The Covenant Code clearly institutes the death penalty for beating a free man to death; in contrast, beating a slave to death was to be avenged only if the slave does not survive for one or two days after the beating. Abraham ben Nathan of Lunel, a 12th-century Provençal scholar, Targum, and Maimonides argue that avenged implies the death penalty, but more recent scholars view it as probably describing a lesser punishment. A number of modern Protestant Bible versions (such as the New Living Translation, New International Version and New Century Version) translate the survival for one or two days as referring to a full and speedy recovery, rather than to a lingering death, as favoured by other recent versions (such as the New Revised Standard Version, and New American Bible).

Manumission
In a parallel with the shmita system the Covenant Code prescribes automatic manumission of male Israelite slaves after they have worked for six years; this excludes non-Israelite slaves, and specifically excludes Israelite daughters, who were sold into slavery by their fathers, from such automatic seventh-year manumission. Such were bought to be betrothed to the owner, or his son, and if that had not been done, they were to be allowed to be redeemed. If the marriage took place, they were to be set free if her husband was negligent in his basic marital obligations. The later Deuteronomic Code is seen by some to contradict elements of this instruction, in extending automatic seventh year manumission to both sexes.

The Deuteronomic Code also extends the seventh-year manumission rule by instructing that Israelite slaves freed in this way should be given livestock, grain, and wine as a parting gift; the literal meaning of the verb used, at this point in the text, for giving this gift seems to be hang round the neck.The Gift is described in The 1901 Jewish Encyclopedia as representing a gift of produce rather than of money or clothing; many Jewish scholars estimated that the value of the three listed products was about 30 shekels, so the gift gradually came to be standardised as produce worth this fixed value. The Bible states that one should not regret freeing the Slave, for slaves were worth Twice the Hired hand to The Master; Nachmanides enumerates this as a command rather than merely as a piece of advice.

Leviticus does not mention seventh-year manumission; instead it only instructs that debt-slaves, and Israelite slaves owned by foreign residents, should be freed during the national Jubilee (occurring either every 49 or every 50 years, depending on interpretation).

While many commentators see the Holiness Code regulations as supplementing the prior legislation mandating manumission in the seventh year, the otherwise potentially long wait until the Jubilee was somewhat alleviated by the Holiness Code, with the instruction that slaves should be allowed to buy their freedom by paying an amount equal to the total wages of a hired servant over the entire period remaining until the next Jubilee (this could be up to 49 years-worth of wages). Blood relatives of the slave were also allowed to buy the slave's freedom, and this became regarded as a duty to be carried out by the next of kin (Hebrew: Go'el).

In the Old Testament, the differences between male and female enslavement were vast. Deuteronomic code applied mostly to men, while women were able to be subjected to a much different type of slavery. This change in status would require a female debt slave to become a permanent fixture of the household by way of marrying the father or the father's son. Deuteronomy 21:9 states that the female slave must be treated as a daughter if such permanent status is to be established.

Abolition of slavery
According to the Jewish Encyclopedia, the slavery of Israelites was abolished by the prophets after the destruction of the Temple of Solomon. The prophet Nehemiah rebuked the wealthy Israelites of his day for continuing to own Israelite slaves.

New Testament
Slavery is mentioned numerous times in the New Testament. The word "servant" is sometimes substituted for the word "slave" in English translations of the Bible.

Gospels
The Bible says that Jesus healed the ill slave of a centurion and restored the cut off ear of the high priest's slave. In his parables, Jesus referenced slavery: the prodigal son, ten gold coins, unforgiving tenant, and tenant farmers. Jesus' teaching on slavery include mentions of spiritual slavery, a slave having two masters (God and mammon), slavery to God, acting as a slave toward others, and the greatest among his disciples being the least of them. Jesus also taught that he would give burdened and weary laborers rest. The Passion narratives are interpreted by the Catholic Church as a fulfillment of the Suffering Servant songs in Isaiah.

Jesus' view of slavery compares the relationship between God and humankind to that of a master and his slaves. Three instances where Jesus communicates this view include:

Matthew 18:21-35: Jesus' Parable of the Unmerciful Servant, wherein Jesus compares the relationship between God and humankind to that of a master and his slaves. Jesus offers the story of a master selling a slave along with his wife and children.

Matthew 20:20-28: A series of remarks wherein Jesus recognizes it is necessary to be a slave to be "first" among the deceased entering heaven.

Matthew 24:36-51: Jesus' Parable of the Faithful Servant, wherein Jesus again compares the relationship between God and humankind to that of a master and his slaves.

Epistles
In Paul's letters to the Ephesians, Paul motivates early Christian slaves to remain loyal and obedient to their masters like they are to Christ. Ephesians 6:5-8 Paul states, “Slaves, be obedient to your human masters with fear and trembling, in sincerity of heart, as to Christ” which is Paul instructing slaves to obey their master. Similar statements regarding obedient slaves can be found in Colossians 3:22-24, 1 Timothy 6:1-2, and Titus 2:9-10. In Col 4:1 Paul advises members of the church, who are slave masters, to "treat your slaves justly and fairly, realizing that you too have a Master in heaven.” Adding to Paul's advice to masters and slaves, he uses slavery as a metaphor. In Romans 1:1 Paul calls himself “a slave of Christ Jesus” and later in Romans 6:18 Paul writes “You have been set free from sin and become slaves to righteousness.” Also in Galatians, Paul writes on the nature of slavery within the kingdom of God. Galatians 3:28 states: “There is neither Jew nor Greek, there is neither slave nor free, there is neither male nor female; for you are all one in Christ Jesus.” We find similar patterns of speech and understanding about slavery in Peter's epistles. In 1 Peter 2:18, Saint Peter writes “Slaves, be subject to your masters with all reverence, not only to those who are good and equitable but also to those who are perverse.” In 1 Timothy 1:10, Paul condemns enslavers with the sexually immoral, abusers of themselves with mankind, enslavers, liars, perjurers, and whatever else is contrary to sound doctrine.

Philemon
The Epistle to Philemon has become an important text in regard to slavery; it was used by pro-slavery advocates as well as by abolitionists. In the epistle, Saint Paul writes to Saint Philemon that he is returning Saint Onesimus, a fugitive slave, back to him; however, Paul also entreats Philemon to regard Onesimus, who he says he views as a son, not as a slave but as a beloved brother in Christ. Philemon is requested to treat Onesimus as he would treat Paul. According to Catholic tradition, Philemon freed Onesimus.

Manumission
The prospect of manumission is an idea prevalent within the New Testament. In contrast to the Old Testament, the New Testament's criteria for manumission encompasses Roman laws on slavery as opposed to the shmita system. Manumission within the Roman system largely depends on the mode of enslavement: slaves were often foreigners, prisoners of war, or those heavily indebted. For foreign-born individuals, manumission was increasingly amorphous; however, if subject to debt slavery, manumission was much more concrete: freedom was granted once the debt was paid. Children were often offered to creditors as a form of payment and their manumission was determined ab initio (at the outset) with the pater (family head). This manicipia (enslavement) of children by the pater did not exclude the selling of children into sexual slavery. If sold into sex slavery, the prospect of complete manumission became much less likely under the stipulations of Roman Law. Being sold into sexual slavery meant greater chance of perpetual servitude, by way of explicit enslavement or forced marriage.

One of the first discussions of manumission in the New Testament can be seen in Paul's interaction with Philemon's slave Onesimus. Onesimus was held captive with Paul, as he was a fugitive, run-away slave. Paul proceeds to baptize the slave Onesimus, and then writes to his owner, Philemon, telling him that he will pay whatever fee Onesimus owes for his fugitive status. Paul does not explicitly ask Philemon for Onesimus's manumission; however, the offer a "fee" for Onesimus's escape has been discussed as a possible latent form of manumission. Paul's treatment of Onesimus additionally brings into question of Roman slavery as a "closed" or "open" slave system. Open slave systems allow for incorporation of freed slaves into society after manumission, while closed systems manumitted slaves still lack social agency or social integration. Roman slavery exhibited characteristics of both, open and closed, systems which further complicates the letter from Paul to Philemon regarding the slave Onesimus.

In the time of the New Testament, there were three modes in which a slave could be manumitted by his or her master: a will could include a formal permission of manumission, a slave could be declared free during a census, or a slave and master could go before a provincial official. These modes of manumission lend evidence to suggest that manumission was an everyday occurrence, and thus complicates New Testament texts encouraging manumission. In 1 Corinthians 7:21, Paul encourages enslaved peoples to pursue manumission; however, this manumission could be connoted in the boundaries of a closed slave system in which manumission does not equate to complete freedom. Modes of manumission, in the New Testament, are once again disputed in a letter from Paul to Galatians in which Paul writes "For freedom Christ has set us free".

Nineteenth-century debates on abolition

An argument made repeatedly is that the slavery mentioned in the Bible is quite different from chattel slavery practiced in the American South, and that in some cases the word "slave" is a mistranslation. For example, Hebrew slaves in Biblical and Talmudic times had many rights that slaves in the American South did not have, including the requirement that Israelite slaves are freed after seven years of servitude. (Israel's foreign slaves, by contrast, were enslaved for life.)

See also

References

External links
 Nave's Topical Index - Slavery
 Andersen, Nathan. "Slave Systems of the Old Testament and the American South: A Study in Contrasts." Studia Antiqua 3, no. 1 (2003).
 Shibboleth on slavery by William Crawley, bbc.co.uk
 25. Submission and Slavery (Ephesians 6:5-9), bible.org

Slavery
Slavery
Slavery
Christianity and race
Christianity and slavery
Debt bondage
Judaism and slavery
Religion and race